Lolly Talk is a Hong Kong Cantopop girl group. They are contestants from ViuTV's reality girl group survival show King Maker IV in 2021. They officially debuted on 11 July 2022.

Current members

Non-active member

Discography

Singles

Filmography

Television shows

Videography

Music videos

Concerts

Joint concerts

Music festivals

Other ventures
"8SEC" is a theme song for Hong Kong Esports Premier League Season 2.
The whole group was invited to Hong Kong Disneyland promote its new character, LinaBell.

Awards and nominations

References

External links
Lolly Talk's Youtube Channel

Lolly Talk's Facebook Page

Hong Kong girl groups
Cantopop musical groups
Musical groups established in 2022
2022 establishments in Hong Kong
Hong Kong idols
King Maker IV contestants